Alinafe Kalemba is an Anglican bishop in Malawi: since 2013  he has been Bishop of Southern Malawi, one of the four  Malawian dioceses within the Church of the Province of Central Africa].

References

Anglican bishops of Southern Malawi
21st-century Anglican bishops in Malawi